Pablo Zárate (died 1905), also known as Willka, was an indigenous Bolivian caudillo. He was an officer in the Bolivian army, reaching the rank of colonel. He led one of the largest Indian rebellions in the history of Bolivia.

Legacy
Zarate Willka Armed Forces of Liberation (Fuerzas Armadas de Liberación Zárate Willka), a Bolivian guerrilla group organized about 1985, was named in honor of Willka.

References

1905 deaths
19th-century Bolivian people
20th-century Bolivian people
Bolivian people of Aymara descent
Executed Bolivian people
Year of birth missing